Beals may refer to:

 Beals, Maine, a town in the United States
 Beals syndrome, a rare congenital connective tissue disorder
 Beals (crater), a lunar crater

People
 Alyn Beals (born 1921), American football player
 Beals Becker (1886–1943), American baseball player
 Beals Wright (1879–1961), American tennis player
 Carlyle Smith Beals (1899–1979), Canadian astronomer
 Dick Beals (1927–2012), American voice actor
 Gary Beals (born 1982), Canadian singer
 Jennifer Beals (born 1963), American film actress
 Melba Pattillo Beals (born 1941), American journalist and member of the Little Rock Nine
 Othilia Carroll Beals (1875–1970), American lawyer and judge
 Richard Beals (mathematician) (born 1938), American mathematician
 Vaughn Beals, American businessman who was CEO and then chairman of Harley-Davidson
 Walter B. Beals, presiding judge from Washington, in the Doctors' Trial

See also
 Beal (disambiguation)
 Beales (disambiguation)